The Wrightsville Unit is an Arkansas Department of Correction prison in Wrightsville, Arkansas.

Over  of land at Wrightsville is dedicated to the raising of cattle and the production of hay.

The land occupied by the unit formerly housed the Negro Boys Industrial School in Wrightsville. For sixty years, there was no marker or memorial that indicated that the boys school existed or that the fire occurred. On April 25, 2019, a monument to the dead was unveiled at the Wrightsville Unit of the Arkansas Department of Correction.

References

External links

Wrightsville Unit

Prisons in Arkansas
Buildings and structures in Pulaski County, Arkansas
1981 establishments in Arkansas